Out of My Mind is a novel by Sharon M. Draper, a New York Times bestselling author. The cover illustration of the fifth edition is by Daniel Chang, and the cover photography is by Cyril Bruneau/Jupiter Images. A reading group guide is enclosed. The book is recommended for ages 10-14 and for grades 5–8. The story was written in first person, featuring Melody Brooks, a girl with cerebral palsy.

Plot 
Melody Brooks is a nearly eleven-year-old girl. Her parents have done everything they can to help her live a normal life, but life is often frustrating for Melody since she cannot speak, move, nor communicate her wishes due to cerebral palsy. As a result, Melody has to fight to get her wishes. At age five, Melody is even diagnosed as "profoundly retarded" by a doctor who suggests putting Melody in a nursing home. In spite of this, Melody's mother enrolls her in Spaulding St. Elementary School to get the education she needs. However, the special education class she is put in, Class H–5, is suited for children with learning disabilities; the class teaches its students the same things every day, i.e., the alphabet. Melody is frustrated by this, as she is advanced beyond the material taught in her lessons but cannot communicate in speech or writing. Her neighbor, Mrs. V, is a kind, but a tough woman. She pushes Melody to do the best she can. When Melody was three, Mrs. V was not impressed by Melody having to rely on her parents for everything. Because of this, Mrs. V forced her to learn how to crawl and roll on the ground. She even taught Melody how to catch herself whenever she fell from her wheelchair. This helped Melody become self-sufficient, but she continues to be reliant on her parents to help feed her and help her go to the bathroom.

When Melody turns eight, her mother becomes pregnant with a new baby. During this time, Melody overhears them talking about the new baby and their fears that it will suffer the same disabilities, causing her to feel ashamed. However, Melody is happy when the baby, Penny, is born perfectly healthy. Melody envies Penny as she grows and matures since she will never be able to do the things Penny can do. However, Melody loves her little sister, and the pleasures Penny brings to the family and to Melody herself.

When Melody enters fifth grade, she becomes frustrated by the difficulty of communicating her wants and needs to those around her. She eventually learns of and gets a communication device that allows her to talk with other people. At school, her new teacher starts an inclusion program that allows special needs students to participate in the standard classes. Melody also gets a dedicated aide, Catherine, who accompanies her throughout most of her school days. Melody befriends Rose Spencer but is bullied by two girls named Molly and Claire, who believe that her disability makes her dumber than them. Melody joins a trivia team known as the Whiz Kids, and she gets a perfect score on the practice test. She then participates in the qualifying exam to be part of the trivia competition and once again, surprises everyone when she makes the team.

On the day the group is to fly to Washington, Melody learns that her noon flight has been canceled due to snow, but that the rest of the team flew the 9:00 am flight without her. The following day Melody insists on going to school, despite the fact that her mother is tired and frustrated. As she and her mother get her ready for school, Melody realizes that Penny has slipped out of the house. Melody hits and kicks at her mother, trying to warn her that Penny is outside and is actually in the path of the car, but her mother fails to understand, resulting in Penny being hit and injured. Melody feels guilty for not being able to warn her mother but learns that Penny will recover. On Monday, Melody's class apologizes for their lack of consideration towards her by giving her the ninth-place trophy that they won, hoping to reconcile with her. However, Melody laughs at them, breaks the trophy, and heads out of the room. The next day, she and Catherine begin work on her autobiography, which begins with the first few lines of the book.

Awards and achievements 
 New York Times Bestselling Novel for nine weeks
 Over 18 months on the New York Times Best Seller List
 Winner of the 2011 Bank Street College of Education Josette Frank Award
 Kirkus Reviews Best Children's Book of 2010
 A San Francisco Chronicle Best Book of The Year
 The Virginia Readers' Choice Reading List for 2011-2012
 A Parents' Choice Silver Honor Book
 
 Essence Magazine Book of the Year
 A 2011 Notable Children's Book in the English Language Arts
 Top 10 Book of the Year for Shelf Awareness
 Cooperative Children's Book Center (CCBC) Choice of 2011
 2011 IRA Teachers' Choice Book
 2011 IRA Young Adult's Choice
2013 Young Hoosier Book Award (Middle Grade)
 Buckeye Children's Book Award from Ohio
 Sunshine State Young Reader's Award in both the middle school and elementary categories
 Black-eyed Susan Book Award
 Beehive Book Award
 Featured in the July 9 issue of Time
 Featured in the July issue of Ladies' Home Journal
 On the Indie National Bestseller List
 Receiver of the SAKURA Award
 A NCTE Notable Children's Book in the Language Arts

Film
In May 2022, it was reported that a film adaptation of the novel is in development for Disney+ with Daniel Siepleman as writer, Amber Sealey as director and Phoebe-Rae Taylor set to star.

Reception 
Critical reception has been positive and seen as a well-written novel. Out of My Mind has received reviews from the Denver Post, the Columbus Dispatch, Publishers Weekly, Children's Literature, the Washington Post, the Horn Book Magazine, and the Bulletin of the Center for Children's Books. The novel received starred reviews from School Library Journal, Booklist, and Kirkus Reviews. Kirkus Reviews praised the book was "rich in detail of both the essential normalcy and the difficulties of a young person with cerebral palsy", and "descriptions of both Melody's challenges—'Going to the bathroom at school just plain sucks'—and the insensitivities of some are unflinching and realistic". Publishers Weekly criticized that there was a "lack of tension in the plot", although it was "resolved halfway through". Booklist stated that Out of My Mind is "a book that defies age categorization, an easy enough read for upper-elementary students yet also a story that will enlighten and resonate with teens and adults". The Bulletin said the novel "[Will make] students think twice about their classmates, acquaintances, and siblings with special needs". The Columbus Dispatch (Ohio) and Pittsburgh Post-Gazette (Pennsylvania) stated "Draper challenges those who read her story to become activists for those who are different". The Denver Post powerfully concluded: "if there's only one book teens and parents (and everyone else) can read this year, Out of My Mind should be it." VOYA praised "Melody's triumphs and setbacks as she strives to become a socially accepted classmate and team member are vividly described in this inspirational novel, which will appeal not only to middle school readers but also to anyone who wonders what might be going on in the minds of individuals with severe physical handicaps". The Horn Book exclaimed that the novel is "a powerfully eye-opening book with both an unforgettable protagonist and a rich cast of fully realized, complicated background characters". Children's Literature said "this is a genuinely moving novel". The Washington Post commented "author Sharon Draper creates an authentic character who insists, through her lively voice and indomitable will, that the reader become fully involved with the girl in the pink wheelchair".

References

External links 

  Sharon Draper Author Page

American children's novels
2010 American novels
Novels set in the United States
Works about cerebral palsy and other paralytic syndromes
Novels set in elementary and primary schools
2010 children's books
Atheneum Books books
Novels by Sharon Draper
Mark Twain Awards